Shanto (Ge'ez: ሻንቶ) is a town in southern Ethiopia. Located in the Wolaita Zone of the Southern Nations, Nationalities, and Peoples Region, This town has a latitude and longitude of 7°01′ 23"N 37°51′49"E with an elevation of 1953 meters above sea level. The town is the administrative center of Damot Pulasa woreda.

Demography
Total population of the town as conducted by central statistical agency of Ethiopia in 2020 is 13,719. Among this figures male population constitutes 6,791 and Females counted 6,928 from total population.

References

Wolayita
Populated places in the Southern Nations, Nationalities, and Peoples' Region
Cities and towns in Wolayita Zone